Jamal Nabi Bakhsh Al-Balushi commonly known as Jamal Al-Balushi (born 22 December 1981) is an Omani footballer who plays for Muscat Club. He was a member of the Oman national football team till 2004.

International career
He was part of the first team squad of the Oman national football team till 2004. Jamal was selected for the national team for the first time in 1997. He has made appearances in the 2002 FIFA World Cup qualification and has represented the national team in the 2006 FIFA World Cup qualification.

References

External links

Juma Al-Wahaibi - GOALZZ.com
Juma Al-Wahaibi - GOALZZ.com
Juma Al-Wahaibi - KOOORA.com
Juma Al-Wahaibi - KOOORA.com

1981 births
Living people
Omani footballers
Oman international footballers
Association football defenders
Bowsher Club players
Muscat Club players
Ahli Sidab Club players
Footballers at the 1998 Asian Games
Footballers at the 2002 Asian Games
Omani people of Baloch descent
Asian Games competitors for Oman